Liza Minnelli is a self-titled studio album by Liza Minnelli. Released on February 26, 1968 by A&M Records in the United States, it contains her interpretations of pop/rock and singer/songwriters' songs.

Album information
Unlike the songs and performances she is today mostly known for, when Minnelli recorded her three studio albums for A&M Records, she chose songs by late '60s and early '70s pop/rock and singer/songwriters. The main inspiration for this change in direction were Peter Allen (the singer's husband at the time) and producer Larry Marks. They were both very fond of Randy Newman, the artist who is the most prominent composer on this collection. The overall mood of this album is somewhat quirky. This and subsequent albums for the label, much like the previous Capitol Records ones, failed to sell or chart. Only a third of the albums managed to crack the Billboard Top 200, but none produced any kind of hit. By then Minnelli had decided to go back to the kind of songs she and her mother usually preferred delivering.

Track listing
"The Debutante's Ball" (Randy Newman)
"Happyland" (Randy Newman)
"The Look of Love" from the film Casino Royale (Hal David, Burt Bacharach)
"(The Tragedy of) Butterfly McHeart" (Peter Allen, Chris Allen)
"Waiting for My Friend" from the film Smashing Time (John Addison, George Melly)
"Married" from the musical Cabaret / "You Better Sit Down Kids" (Fred Ebb, John Kander)/(Sonny Bono)
"So Long Dad" (Randy Newman)
"For No One" (John Lennon, Paul McCartney)
"My Mammy" (Sam M. Lewis, Joe Young, Walter Donaldson)
"The Happy Time" (Fred Ebb, John Kander)

Re-release
The album was released on CD in its entirety for the first time as part of Liza Minnelli: The Complete A&M Recordings, a 2-CD set released by Collector's Choice Music in 2008. This included outtakes and previously unreleased recordings from the A&M recording sessions.

Personnel
 Produced by Larry Marks
 Arranged by Peter Matz (tracks 3, 5-8, 10), Nick De Caro (tracks 1, 2, 11), Bob Thompson (track 9), J. Hill (track 4)
 Original album engineers: Ray Gerhardt, Don Hahn, Peter Matz 
 Album design: Corporate Head
 Art director: Tom Wilkes
 Photography: Guy Webster

References

Liza Minnelli: When It Comes Down to It.......1968–1977 liner notes by Glenn A. Baker, 2003
Liza Minnelli: The Complete A&M Recordings liner notes by Scott Schechter, 2008
Liza Minnelli: The Complete Capitol Collection liner notes by Scott Schechter, 2006

Liza Minnelli albums
1968 albums
Albums arranged by Peter Matz
Albums arranged by Bob Thompson (musician)
A&M Records albums